Jaylin Malik Davis (born July 1, 1994) is an American professional baseball outfielder in the New York Mets organization. He has previously played in Major League Baseball (MLB) for the San Francisco Giants and Boston Red Sox. He played college baseball for Appalachian State University then was drafted by the Minnesota Twins in the 24th round of the 2015 MLB draft.

Amateur career
Davis attended Northeast Guilford High School in McLeansville, North Carolina, where he had a .453 batting average as a sophomore, .468 as a junior and .483 as a senior. He was  all-state and conference player of the year in his senior year.

Davis attended Appalachian State University, where he majored in health promotion and played college baseball. In 2013, he was a Louisville Slugger freshman all-American, and was named the Southern Conference freshman of the year. He was selected by the Minnesota Twins in the 24th round of the 2015 MLB draft.

Professional career

Minnesota Twins
Davis spent his first professional season in 2016 with the rookie-level Elizabethton Twins and Class A Cedar Rapids Kernels, registering a .255/.341/.523 slash line with 16 home runs and 41 RBIs over 64 games. He played in 2017 with Cedar Rapids and the Class A-Advanced Fort Myers Miracle, slashing .253/.303/.416 with 15 home runs, 66 RBIs, and 147 strikeouts in 125 games.

He played in 2018 with Fort Myers (with whom he was named a Florida State League All-Star) and the Double-A Chattanooga Lookouts, hitting .273/.347/.412 with 11 home runs, 53 RBIs, and 126 strikeouts in 120 games. After the 2018 season, he played in the Arizona Fall League.

Davis started 2019 with the Double-A Pensacola Blue Wahoos, earning Southern League All-Star honors, and was promoted to the Triple-A Rochester Red Wings during the season. In Rochester, Davis earned International League Player of The Month honors for the month of July.

San Francisco Giants
On July 31, 2019, the Twins traded Davis, Prelander Berroa, and Kai-Wei Teng to the San Francisco Giants in exchange for Sam Dyson. Following the trade, he was assigned to the Triple-A Sacramento River Cats of the Pacific Coast League. With three minor-league teams during 2019 he hit a combined .306/.397/.590 with 35 home runs, 10 stolen bases, and 94 RBIs while striking out 138 times in 468 at bats.

On September 4, 2019, the Giants selected Davis' contract and promoted him to the major leagues. He made his major-league debut that night versus the St. Louis Cardinals, hitting an infield single off of Michael Wacha. Davis hit his first major-league home run on September 25, a walk-off off of D. J. Johnson of the Colorado Rockies. For the 2019 season, he batted .167/.255/.238 in 42 at bats. In 2020 for the Giants, Davis batted .167/.167/.417 with a home run and an RBI in 12 at bats.

On April 11, 2021, Davis was placed on the 60-day injured list with left knee tendinitis. He was activated from the injured list on July 1. During the 2021 season for the Giants, Davis batted one-for-nine (0.111). With Triple-A Sacramento, he batted .230/.317/.503 with 34 runs, 11 home runs, and 34 RBIs in 161 at bats. He began the 2022 season with Sacramento and was designated for assignment on April 21.

Boston Red Sox
On April 28, 2022, Davis was claimed off waivers by the Boston Red Sox and assigned to the Triple-A Worcester Red Sox. He was added to Boston's active roster on April 29, and made his Red Sox debut on May 1. He split time between Worcester and Boston during the season, batting .203 in 88 minor-league games with Worcester, and .333 in 12 major-league games with Boston. On May 14, Davis was designated for assignment when Rich Hill was activated off of the COVID-19 injured list. On May 19, he cleared waivers and was sent outright to Triple-A Worcester.

On September 12, the Red Sox designated Davis for assignment to clear roster space for infielder Yu Chang. Davis was subsequently sent outright to Worcester, and elected free agency on October 6.

New York Mets
On February 24, 2023, Davis signed a minor league contract with the New York Mets organization.

References

External links

Appalachian State Mountaineers bio

1994 births
Living people
African-American baseball players
Baseball players from Greensboro, North Carolina
Major League Baseball outfielders
San Francisco Giants players
Boston Red Sox players
Appalachian State Mountaineers baseball players
Elizabethton Twins players
Cedar Rapids Kernels players
Fort Myers Miracle players
Chattanooga Lookouts players
Pensacola Blue Wahoos players
Rochester Red Wings players
Sacramento River Cats players
Salt River Rafters players
Worcester Red Sox players
21st-century African-American sportspeople